El Arenal is a village and municipality of Spain located in the province of Ávila, within  the autonomous community of Castile and León. The municipality has a total area of 27.08 km2. It is part of the Sierra de Gredos Regional Park.

References 

Municipalities in the Province of Ávila